Blackwell is a city in Kay County, Oklahoma, United States, located at the intersection of U.S. Highway 177 and State Highway 11 along Interstate 35 (exit #222). The population was 7,092 at the 2010 census and 6,085 in the 2020 Census. Blackwell was established following the September 16, 1893 Cherokee Outlet land run by A. J. Blackwell. Blackwell has an agricultural and fossil fuel based economy.

History

Founding
Blackwell came into existence during the Cherokee Outlet Opening on September 16, 1893 in the run known as the Cherokee Strip Land Run. The town is named for A. J. Blackwell, who was the dominant force in its founding. Andrew Blackwell had settled in the area in 1882, having married the former Rosa Vaught who was of Cherokee descent, he was eligible to found the city. Blackwell served as Justice of the Peace and Mayor of Blackwell.

Blackwell's first school opened in September 1893 in a small, frame building with fifty-two students in attendance. A gradual enrollment increase created a need for ten teachers by 1899.

A post office was established on December 1, 1893. Due to a struggle for regional prominence between Blackwell and nearby Parker, the post office was named Parker from April 2, 1894, to February 4, 1895. After that, the name reverted to Blackwell.

Prior to the Civil Rights Movement Blackwell had a reputation as a sundown town, having kept out African Americans through violent expulsion and the display of a sign warning them to leave town by sunset. Blackwell's expulsion of its African-American residents around 1893 is described in the 1967 book From Slavery to Freedom by John Hope Franklin.

Zinc Smelter
The Blackwell Zinc Company smelter first began operations in 1917. In 1974, the 80-acre Blackwell Zinc Smelter facility ceased operations. At the time, it was the city's largest employer, employing 800 people in 1972, and over 1,000 at its peak. It also was one of the largest zinc smelter facilities in the United States. After its closure the land and was donated to the Blackwell Industrial Authority (BIA). Soil from the land was repurposed throughout the city, leading to widespread contamination of air and water, including the Chikaskia River.   
Additionally, one of the plant's two Corliss stationary steam engines was moved to Pawnee Oklahoma and preserved. This engine is run for viewing by the public on the first weekend of May.

The Oklahoma Department of Environmental Quality has been overseeing remediation of contamination at the industrial park, groundwater, and soil throughout parts of the city since 1992. Phelps Dodge Corporation, a subsidiary of Freeport-McMoRan Copper & Gold Inc, has owned the site since 1999. On October 15, 2009 the City of Blackwell filed suit against Freeport-McMoRan calling the contamination a nuisance, and alleging that 58 million pounds of toxic waste remained in the city, causing illness within its 7,200 residents. Following several changes of venue between Federal court and Kay County courts, the City of Blackwell and Freeport settled for 54-million dollars on February 4, 2010.

1955 F5 tornado

Blackwell was a victim of the 1955 Great Plains tornado outbreak, a deadly tornado outbreak that struck the southern and central U.S Great Plains States on May 25–26, 1955. It produced at least 46 tornadoes across seven states including two F5 tornadoes in Blackwell, Oklahoma, and Udall, Kansas. The outbreak killed 102 from three tornadoes while injuring hundreds more. Unusual electromagnetic activity was observed, including St. Elmo's fire.

The Blackwell tornado formed in Noble County at around 9:00pm CDT before crossing through the eastern portions of the Kay County town of Blackwell as an F5 wedge tornado. Along with destroying nearly 200 homes, the tornado demolished two of the town's main employers, the Acme Foundry and the Hazel Atlas Glass plant. 400 homes were destroyed or swept away, and 500 other homes were damaged. Sixty businesses were also destroyed and the local hospital sustained major damage. Most of the western half of the town was spared the worst of the damage.

To commemorate the 1955 tornado, the Top of Oklahoma Historical Society Museum housed in the 1912 Electric Park Pavilion in Blackwell put on a special exhibition "F5 in 1955" which included a  ‘tornado room’ which displayed artifacts, information, and photographs of the event. Over a year in the making, the exhibit occupied an entire room and was made possible with financial support from the city of Blackwell. “Working with the wonderful people at the Top of Oklahoma Museum and the Udall Historical Society was the best part of the creation of the “F5 in 1955” exhibit," said Dianne Braden, tornado survivor. "To commemorate the event and the loss of 107 people was important to all of us. There’s something for every age in the exhibit.”

Geography
Blackwell is located at  (36.801764, -97.289856), along the Chikaskia River and to the east of Interstate 35.

Climate
In May 1906, an L5 meteorite fell, landing in Blackwell, Oklahoma. 
On May 25, 1955, a deadly F5 tornado, part of the 1955 Great Plains tornado outbreak,  struck Blackwell at approximately 9:30pm and cut a swath of destruction through the northeastern portion of the city, roughly centered in the neighborhoods surrounding Riverside Park.  20 residents died and over 250 were injured. The tornado outbreak included another F5 tornado that struck Udall, Kansas killing 80 people and injuring over 270. The outbreak spawned 19 tornadoes across Oklahoma, Texas and Kansas alone.

Demographics

As of the census of 2000, there were 7,668 people, 3,064 households, and 2,086 families residing in the city. The population density was 1,407.3 people per square mile (543.2/km). There were 3,527 housing units at an average density of 647.3 per square mile (249.9/km). The racial makeup of the city was 87.26% White, 4.13% Native American, 0.47% Asian, 0.13% African American, 0.01% Pacific Islander, 3.17% from other races, and 4.83% from two or more races. Hispanic or Latino of any race were 5.91% of the population.

There were 3,064 households, out of which 32.1% had children under the age of 18 living with them, 54.1% were married couples living together, 9.9% had a female householder with no husband present, and 31.9% were non-families. 28.8% of all households were made up of individuals, and 15.1% had someone living alone who was 65 years of age or older. The average household size was 2.46 and the average family size was 3.01.

In the city, the population was spread out, with 27.0% under the age of 18, 9.0% from 18 to 24, 23.9% from 25 to 44, 21.5% from 45 to 64, and 18.6% who were 65 years of age or older. The median age was 38 years. For every 100 females, there were 92.1 males. For every 100 females age 18 and over, there were 88.7 males.

The median income for a household in the city was $25,835, and the median income for a family was $31,540. Males had a median income of $25,202 versus $16,704 for females. The per capita income for the city was $13,558. About 13.1% of families and 17.1% of the population were below the poverty line, including 22.4% of those under age 18 and 10.4% of those age 65 or over.

Arts and culture

Parks, museums, and cultural events
The Top of Oklahoma Historical Society Museum is located in the Electric Park Pavilion and displays artifacts from the land run, antiques, and local history. Blackwell hosts the Kay County Free Fair in September. Blackwell is served by 5 major parks including Riverside, Bagby, Rogers, Memorial, and Legion parks. Blackwell has a public pool, Blackwell Memorial Pool, which has one of the state's 12 Statue of Liberty replicas installed by the Boy Scouts of America in 1951.

The Blackwell Public Library offers a variety of community resources as well as events, classes, and workshops.

The 9-hole "Blackwell" course at the Blackwell Municipal Golf Course facility opened in 1926. It features 3,143 yards of golf from the longest tees for a par of 36. The course rating is 70.2 and it has a slope rating of 120 on Bermuda grass.

Blackwell currently hosts the State of Oklahoma's first Barn Quilt Geo-Trail which consists of 60 uniquely designed barn quilts representing all 50 states of the U.S. as well as several uniquely created designs

Historically, Blackwell also held the Tulips of Bloom Festival which celebrated springtime in Oklahoma.

Blackwell is home to eight locations on the National Register of Historic Places including the brick WPA Armory, the Rivoli Theatre, and the Larkin Hotel where aviator Amelia Earheart stayed just six months prior to her disappearance.

Sports 
In 2023, The Pecos League announced that a new baseball team will be put in Blackwell, The Blackwell Fly Catchers.

Government
Blackwell is a Home Rule Charter City, which is governed by Council-City Manager form of government.  The current City Manager is Jerry Wieland.  The City Council consists of Robert Husted, Chad Shepherd, Jon Webb and Richard Braden, with Mayor's position currently held by T.J. Greenfield. The Chief of Police is Dewayne Wood and the Fire Chief is Cordell Hanebrink.

Education
The Blackwell School District consists of Blackwell Elementary, Blackwell Middle School, and Blackwell High School. As recently as 2017 Huston, Northside, Parkside, and Washington Elementary Schools were used for Pre-K through 5th grade classes. The former school sites are all listed on the National Register of Historic Places. Blackwell's school mascot is the Maroon Spirit, which was memorialized in the Maroon Park on Main Street with a mural painted by the Blackwell High School art class depicting the Maroon Spirit with the names of the seniors given the title of "Maroon Spirit" and "Miss BHS" dating back to the early 1900s. Historically, Oklahoma Baptist College served the city's higher education needs between 1901 and 1913.

Media
Blackwell's local paper is the Blackwell Journal-Tribune. A local radio station KOKB 1580 AM, used to broadcast local sports as well as Northern Oklahoma College's KAYE and the Ponca City-based KLOR.

Infrastructure
Blackwell has a full-service city government, that includes, electricity, water, sewage, recreation, police and fire services.  The police department has 17 full-time officers, a jail and operates 24 hours per day.  The Blackwell Fire Department is a full-time fire department, staffed with 20 paid firefighters/EMT/Paramedics and also provides ambulance service to Blackwell and the surrounding communities.

Transportation
Blackwell is home to the  Blackwell-Tonkawa Municipal Airport  with neighboring Tonkawa, Oklahoma. Historically, Blackwell was home to the Blackwell, Enid and Southwestern Railway.

Healthcare
Blackwell and the surrounding communities are served by Stillwater Medical Center's Blackwell branch, a 53-bed facility with 24-hour emergency services and Heli-Pad.

Notable people
Joe Allbaugh, Former FEMA Director, former Interim City Manager
Jack Brisco, professional wrestler; former National Wrestling Alliance World Heavyweight Champion, inducted in the WWE Hall of Fame in 2008.
Jerry Brisco, professional wrestler and longtime employee of World Wrestling Entertainment, Also a WWE Hall of Famer, alongside his brother, Jack Brisco.
Stephen Aloysius Leven, prelate of the Roman Catholic Church.
William J. McDaniel, retired United States Navy Rear Admiral
Jamie McGuire, best-selling romance novelist.
Brad Penny, Major League Baseball pitcher.
Jim Reese, former member of the Oklahoma House of Representatives and commissioner of the Oklahoma Department of Agriculture
Paul G. Risser, former president of several colleges and the chancellor of the Oklahoma State System of Higher Education
Natalie Shirley, former Secretary of Commerce and Tourism and current President of OSU-OKC

See also
 1955 Great Plains tornado outbreak

References

External links
 City Of Blackwell
 Blackwell Chamber of Commerce
 Blackwell Event Center and Fairgrounds https://www.blackwelleventcenter.com/
 Blackwell Journal-Tribune, 
 Blackwell Community Outreach
 Encyclopedia of Oklahoma History and Culture - Blackwell
 Oklahoma Digital Maps: Digital Collections of Oklahoma and Indian Territory

Cities in Kay County, Oklahoma
Cities in Oklahoma
Populated places established in 1893
1893 establishments in Oklahoma Territory
Sundown towns in Oklahoma